Helge Leonard Miettunen (9 September 1916 – 21 June 1986) was a Finnish writer, media executive and politician, born in Vaasa. He was a Member of the Parliament of Finland from 1951 to 1958, representing the People's Party of Finland.

References

1916 births
1986 deaths
People from Vaasa
People from Vaasa Province (Grand Duchy of Finland)
People's Party of Finland (1951) politicians
Members of the Parliament of Finland (1951–54)
Members of the Parliament of Finland (1954–58)
Finnish writers
Writers from Ostrobothnia (region)